Wertheimeria maculata is the only species in the genus Wertheimeria of the catfish (order Siluriformes) family Doradidae. This species is endemic to Brazil and is found in the Jequitinhonha and Pardo Rivers. These fish reach a length of  SL. Within its restricted range, W. maculata faces strong human habitat disturbances such as siltation, habitat fragmentation, pollution, and introduced species. This fish has been placed as the sister taxon to all other doradids.

References

Doradidae
Catfish of South America
Fish of the Jequitinhonha River basin
Endemic fauna of Brazil
Fish described in 1877
Taxa named by Franz Steindachner